Kingmaker is the fifteenth studio album by Danish hard rock/heavy metal Pretty Maids. The album was released in Japan on 21 October 2016, and in the rest of the world on 4 November 2016 by Frontiers Records. It is the first album of all new material since Motherland (2013). Kingmaker is the first album without keyboard player Morten Sandager who left the band in February 2016 after joining Pretty Maids in 2006. Instead Kim Olesen of Anubis Gate plays keyboards on the album.

In an interview with The Classic Metal Show, lead singer Ronnie Atkins said of the album: "Basically we are big pop freaks as well. We like all kinds of music and to us a good song is a good song. Some of the stuff is actually written on an acoustic guitar. There are songs on the album that are basically pop songs. You could take songs like "Heavens Little Devil", basically just a pop song. The challenge is turning a pop song into a rock song."

The album debuted at number 35 on the German Albums Chart, becoming Pretty Maids' highest-charting album since Jump the Gun in 1990 (which also charted at number 35). However, the album failed to chart in their native Denmark.

Danish music magazine Gaffa rated the album four out of five stars and wrote: "Kingmaker is thus the third album in a row, where there is a vast majority of hits compared to misses."

Track listing

Personnel
Ronnie Atkins – vocals, writer
Ken Hammer – guitar, writer
René Shades – bass, bass and guitar solos engineering
Allan Tschicaja – drums
Kim Olesen – keyboards
Jacob Hansen – producer, engineer, mixer, mastering
Chris Laney – additional guitar solos engineering
Janne Stark – additional guitar solos engineering
Jonas Haagensen – assistant engineer

Charts

References

2016 albums
Pretty Maids albums
Frontiers Records albums